MDP Wethersfield is a Ministry of Defence facility in Essex, England, located north of the village of Wethersfield, about  north-west of the town of Braintree.  Originally an RAF station, the original accommodation areas have now been converted to become the headquarters and training centre of the Ministry of Defence Police.

It started as RAF Station Wethersfield opening in 1944 and during World War II it was used by the Royal Air Force and United States Army Air Forces.  It was closed in 1946, and was reopened in 1951 as a result of the Cold War.  Used until 1970 as a United States Air Force fighter airfield, it was held as a reserve airfield until 1993, when it came under control of the Ministry of Defence Police.

History

Use by the USAAF
RAF Wethersfield was allocated by the RAF to the United States Army Air Forces Ninth Air Force in August 1942.  For security reasons, it was known as USAAF Station AAF-170 rather than its location during the war. Its station ID was "WF" but it was still RAF Wethersfield.

416th Bombardment Group (light)
The 416th Bombardment Group (light) arrived from Laurel Army Airfield, Mississippi, USA on 1 February 1944, flying the twin-engine Douglas A-20G "Havoc" aircraft. Its operational squadrons and fuselage codes were:

 668th Bombardment Squadron (5H)
 669th Bombardment Squadron (2A)
 670th Bombardment Squadron (F6)
 671st Bombardment Squadron (5C)

On 21 September 1944 the 416th moved to their Advanced Landing Ground at Melun/Villaroche France (A-55).

Use by the RAF Bomber Command

Soon after the Americans departed for France, Wethersfield was returned to RAF control, becoming the home for 196 and 299 Squadrons, 38 Group, RAF Bomber Command.

During the late 1940s the base was used as a winter camping ground for Chipperfield's Circus. Elephants were housed in the maintenance hangars and the huts became homes for other circus animals.

Use by the USAF

20th Fighter Bomber / Tactical Fighter Wing

In 1951, as a result of the Cold War threat of the Soviet Union, the British provided RAF Wethersfield to the USAF as part of their NATO commitment.  Work on upgrading the facilities at Wethersfield commenced that same year.  The United States was rapidly expanding its air force, increasing the number of combat wings from 48 in 1950 to 95 by June 1952. The 20th Fighter-Bomber Wing was transferred from Langley AFB in Virginia, USA and took up residence at RAF Wethersfield on 31 May 1952.

The transfer was intended to address the defence problem posed by Soviet conventional superiority in Western Europe. The 20th FBW consisted of three operational squadrons: the 55th, 77th, and 79th Fighter-Bomber Squadrons, flying the F-84G "Thunderjets". The F-84Gs were specially equipped to carry small nuclear bombs, and could deliver these weapons on Soviet forces if they invaded West Germany.

RAF Woodbridge was operated as a detachment of the 20th FBW until 8 July 1958, when the 20th FBW/TFW handed over control to the 81st Tactical Fighter Wing.  The 79th TFS remained at the base under the control of the 20th TFW until 1970.

In June 1955 the 20th FBW started receiving the F-84F "Thunderstreak" in addition to its F-84Ds and F-84Gs.  The F-84G was phased out by June 1955, with the aircraft being transferred to Allied nations in Europe and the Middle East. The 20th flew the F-84F until 16 June 1957 when the conversion to the North American F-100D and F-100F "Super Sabres" began.  The F-100 remained the primary aircraft at RAF Wethersfield until 1970.

The 20th Fighter Bomber Wing established an operational detachment at Wheelus AB, Libya, in February 1958.  This detachment managed the USAFE Weapons Training Center for month-long squadron rotations by the Europe-based USAFE tactical fighter wings.

The 20th began realigning its units 15 March 1957 as part of an Air Force worldwide reorganization. Combat groups were inactivated, assigning the unit's fighter mission to the wing. As part of another organization change, the 20th dropped the "Fighter Bomber" designation on 8 July 1958, becoming the 20th Tactical Fighter Wing. The three flying units also changed designation, becoming tactical fighter squadrons. The flying squadrons were dispersed on a monthly rotational basis to RAF Alconbury, RAF Woodbridge, and Nouasseur AB, Morocco, due to runway repairs at Wethersfield from May to August 1958.

Starting in July 1966, bases in Turkey, Spain, and Italy were transferred from Tactical Air Command to USAFE.  USAFE was responsible for deploying fighter squadrons to these bases. The 20th began monthly rotations of its fighter squadrons to Cigli AB, Turkey, starting in July 1966.  Rotations to Aviano AB, Italy, began in December 1966.  Rotations to Zaragoza AB, Spain, began in January 1970. Rotations to all these bases continued until June 1970.

The closure of US bases in France forced the opening of RAF Greenham Common under 20th TFW management to handle personnel overflow beginning in January 1967.  A military coup in Libya forced the closure of the range at Wheelus AB in September 1969 and the closure of the 20th TFW's detachment in Libya.  The range was relocated to Torrejon AB, Spain, in November 1969. On 10 December 1969, Detachment 1, 20th Tactical Fighter Wing was established at RAF Upper Heyford as part of congressional budget cutbacks and a USAFE-wide base realignment and consolidation of units.  RAF Wethersfield had a limited potential for development and was close to the expanding London Stansted Airport.

The fighter squadrons of the 20th had been in constant rotation since the arrival of the wing at Wethersfield in 1952.  As part of budget reductions and to consolidate all of the wing's elements at a larger facility, the 20th Tactical Fighter Wing was relocated from Wethersfield to RAF Upper Heyford, replacing and absorbing the 66th Tactical Reconnaissance Wing, which had relocated from Laon AB, France, to the UK on 1 June 1970. The aging 1950s-era F-100s of the 20th TFW and RF-101 "Voodoos" of the 66th TRW were retired, and were replaced by the General Dynamics F-111E Fighter-Bomber at RAF Upper Heyford.

66th Combat Support Squadron

The 66th Tactical Reconnaissance Wing at RAF Upper Heyford was inactivated and elements were moved to RAF Wethersfield.  As a result, became a Dispersed Operations Base until September 1970, when the airfield mission was changed to that of Standby Deployment Base, ready to support augmentation forces if directed. In October 1970, elements, primarily Civil Engineering, of the inactivated 66th TRW were moved to RAF Wethersfield, being designated the 66th Combat Support Group. The group was again re-designated 66th Combat Support Squadron and became the host unit at RAF Wethersfield.  The 66th CSS performed whatever duties were necessary to keep the airfield in a usable, operational state. On 1 June 1985 the 66th was reactivated as the 66th Electronic Combat Wing at Sembach AB, West Germany.

10th Tactical Reconnaissance Wing

In August 1976 the 66th CSS became Detachment 1, 10th Tactical Reconnaissance Wing (TRW), based at RAF Alconbury.  Under the 10th TRW, the station became a satellite of RAF Alconbury, storing much of the 10th TRW's War Reserve Material assets in its hangars. In addition, the 10th TRW supported a number of units including the 819th Civil Engineering Squadron Heavy Repair (CESHR) and Det. 1 2166th Information Systems Squadron (later redesignated Det. 1 2166th Communications Squadron).

819th RED HORSE SQUADRON

In 1978 the British and American Governments agreed to establish a Rapid Engineer Deployable Heavy Operational Repair Squadron Engineers (RED HORSE) unit in the UK. The main RED HORSE Civil Engineering unit established in December 1978 was the 819th CES. The 7119th Air Base Flight, later designated the 7119th Support Group, was established to manage the personnel and organisational issues for units at RAF Wethersfield. The 819th was tasked with rapid runway repair responsibilities for US Air Forces in Europe, along with its usual heavy repair role.

As the American involvement in the Vietnam War wound down, the role of RED HORSE units in peacetime came into question.  As the need still existed for a quick-acting heavy repair force integral to the USAF Air Force and responsive to USAF commanders, a variety of training programs were developed, including civil engineering projects to develop skills similar to those required during a contingency.  In 1980 members of the 819th removed and re-installed seven bells and a bell cage in an 11th-century church in Finchingfield, Essex. The goodwill generated in the village, located a mile from RAF Wethersfield, resulted in enhanced housing and community support for USAF personnel.

The 819th, along with the 2166th Communications Squadron, were the main units at Wethersfeld until the USAF returned the base to the British in 1990 due to budget cutbacks. The 819th was inactivated in February, while the 2166th remained active until June 1992. The base was handed back to the Royal Air Force at a ceremony on 3 July 1990 and Wethersfield was once again placed under care and maintenance status. The USAF retained a small Military Family Housing area at Wethersfield, in which American personnel assigned to RAF Molesworth, RAF Alconbury, and RAF Upwood lived.

Current use

On 6 June 1982 No. 614 Volunteer Gliding Squadron RAF moved to MDP Wethersfield from RAF Debden, as that base was required for tank training.  The squadron currently operates Grob Viking TX.1 gliders, maintaining a fleet of between six and eleven. The squadron's headquarters is in one of the two remaining T2 hangars. The gliders are used to provide members of the Royal Air Force Air Cadets with gliding experience. Gliding scholarships and advanced glider training are available. In addition to the gliders, the squadron operates four Land Rover Defenders, a Lamborghini tractor, and two Van Gelder six drum trailer type winches. The squadron consists of 40 to 60 personnel who annually conduct around 6,000 launches, producing more than 800 hours of air time.

In April 1991, the Chief Constable of the Ministry of Defence Police (MDP) assumed responsibility for the site. A small, joint civilian-uniformed team was established to oversee the refurbishment of a number of buildings to prepare for the relocation of the Ministry of Defence Police Training School and Firearms Training Wing from Medmenham, Buckinghamshire, and the headquarters from Earl's Court in London by March 1993. The Training Centres commenced operation on 1 April 1993.

The Operational Support Unit moved to Wethersfield from RAF Wittering and has been permanently based there since May 1992. In addition, Wethersfield was to be the home for the MOD Guard Service (MGS) Training School.  The move in October 1994 of the MDP training and headquarters, along with the MGS Training Wing, gave the Force its first combined HQ and Training Centre.

Gardiner Associates, a fire investigation training provider, began providing residential fire investigation training courses for police, fire and forensic science practitioners at MDP Wethersfield in 2000. Millbrook Engineering uses Wethersfield as its "Extreme Manoeuvre Facility", which they describe as a "high security location for extreme dynamics evaluation and driver training with the world's largest on and off-road vehicles."

All three wartime-era runways and connecting taxiways, as well as many wartime loop-type dispersal hardstands, remain in good condition. The post-war jet runway laid down for USAF fighters during the 1950s and 1960s is still intact. The large main hangar, used by the USAF until the facility was closed, is well maintained, as are numerous buildings and Nissen huts used by the MOD Police.

In late March 2016, the Ministry of Defence announced that the site was one of ten to be sold in order to reduce the size of the Defence estate. The disposal date was later extended to 2025.

See also

 List of Royal Air Force stations
 List of former Royal Air Force stations

References

Citations

Bibliography
 Freeman, Roger A. (1994) UK Airfields of the Ninth: Then and Now 1994. After the Battle 
 Freeman, Roger A. (1996) The Ninth Air Force in Colour: UK and the Continent-World War Two. After the Battle 
 Maurer, Maurer (1983). Air Force Combat Units of World War II. Maxwell AFB, Alabama: Office of Air Force History. .
 Menard, David W. (1998) Before Centuries: USAFE Fighters, 1948–1959. Howell Press. 
 Martin, Patrick (1994). Tail Code: The Complete History of USAF Tactical Aircraft Tail Code Markings. Schiffer Military Aviation History. .
 Ravenstein, Charles A. (1984). Air Force Combat Wings Lineage and Honors Histories 1947–1977. Maxwell AFB, Alabama: Office of Air Force History. .
 USAAS-USAAC-USAAF-USAF Aircraft Serial Numbers—1908 to present
 Millbrook track facilities

External links

416th Bomb Group (Light)
614 Volunteer Gliding Squadron
20th Fighter Wing
20th FDW/TFW F-100 photos
66th Air Base Wing
10th Air Base Wing, USAFA
Munitions Maintenance Squadron
819th Civil Engineering (RED HORSE) Squadron
RAF Wethersfield memorial site

Royal Air Force stations in Essex
Military establishments in Essex
614 VGS
Ministry of Defence Police
Trident (UK nuclear programme)
Finchingfield